The 1958 New Mexico A&M Aggies football team was an American football team that represented New Mexico State University in the Border Conference during the 1958 NCAA University Division football season. In its first year under head coach Warren B. Woodson, the team compiled a 4–6 record (1–3 against conference opponents), finished in fourth place in the conference, and was outscored by a total of 228 to 172.

Woodson was later inducted into the College Football Hall of Fame.

Schedule

References

New Mexico AandM
New Mexico State Aggies football seasons
New Mexico AandM Aggies football